The Tour of the Bahamas is a road cycling race held in Nassau, the capital of The Bahamas. The Tour is a competition over three stages. On the first stage there is an individual time trial, a race against the clock, followed by a circuit race, the next day. Finally, a road race is held, this stage is the only stage that leaves Nassau City. Due to the Bahamas's warm climate, the race is used by many cyclists to kick off their racing seasons.

Past winners

References

Cycle races in the Bahamas
Recurring sporting events established in 2006
2006 establishments in the Bahamas
Men's road bicycle races